Janet Theresa "Jane" Sixsmith  (born 5 September 1967 in Sutton Coldfield, Birmingham, West Midlands) is a  field hockey player, who was a member of the British squad that won the bronze medal at the 1992 Summer Olympics in Barcelona. She retired from the international scene after scoring over hundred goals and winning 165 caps for England and 158 for Great Britain. Sixsmith was the first British female hockey player to have appeared at four Olympic Games, followed by Kate Richardson-Walsh including the 2000 Summer Olympics in Sydney, Australia. Jane continues to play National League for Sutton Coldfield Hockey Club.

Sixsmith took up hockey when, at the age of twelve, she was told she could no longer play for a boys' football team. She played hockey at club level for her hometown, Sutton Coldfield. As a teenager, she was selected as a reserve for the England under-18 netball team before being chosen for England's under-18 hockey squad. Jane attended St Joseph's Catholic Primary School and Bishop Walsh Catholic School.

Jane recently took part in the 2013 Maxifuels Super Sixes indoor hockey finals with her team Sutton Coldfield.  They reached the final after beating Bowden Hightown in the Semi Finals.  Jane scored the second goal in her team's 2-5 defeat to champions Reading HC in the final at Wembley  Arena on 27 January 2013.

Sixsmith's honours include an MBE, an Olympic bronze, a European Cup gold (1991) and a Commonwealth silver medal (1998).

References

External links
 
 
 Jane Sixsmith at the British Olympic Committee
 

1967 births
Living people
English female field hockey players
Field hockey players at the 1988 Summer Olympics
Field hockey players at the 1992 Summer Olympics
Field hockey players at the 1996 Summer Olympics
Field hockey players at the 2000 Summer Olympics
Olympic field hockey players of Great Britain
British female field hockey players
Olympic bronze medallists for Great Britain
Sportspeople from Sutton Coldfield
Commonwealth Games silver medallists for England
Members of the Order of the British Empire
Olympic medalists in field hockey
Medalists at the 1992 Summer Olympics
Commonwealth Games medallists in field hockey
Field hockey players at the 1998 Commonwealth Games
Medallists at the 1998 Commonwealth Games